Tjerita Roman ("novel story" in Malay; Perfected Spelling Cerita Roman) was a monthly Peranakan Chinese, Malay-language literary magazine published in the Dutch East Indies from 1929 to 1942. It was one of the most successful literary publications in the Indies, publishing hundreds of novels, plays and short stories during its run. Among its authors were many of the notables of the Chinese Indonesian literary world including Njoo Cheong Seng, Pouw Kioe An, Tan Boen Soan, and Liem Khing Hoo.

History
 was founded in Surabaya, East Java, Dutch East Indies (now Indonesia) in late 1929 by Ong Ping Lok and others from the editorial team behind the successful magazines Penghidoepan and Liberty. At first it was printed by the firm Hahn & Co. in Surabaya, with capital provided by a businessman named Han Sing Thjiang, who was owner of Liberty magazine. Ong Ping Lok, who in addition to being editor wrote fiction under the pen name Monsieur Novel, often printed his own pieces in the magazine. The magazine quickly rose in popularity to surpass  and Liberty.

The contents of the magazine also reflected shifting tastes among Chinese Indonesian readers; while publications of the 1910s had often consisted of historical martial arts or cloak-and-dagger stories set in China,  mainly printed stories written and set in the contemporary Dutch East Indies. The magazine also sometimes printed stories or novels by women authors, which was unheard of before the 1920s in the Indies; these included Nyonya The Tiang Ek and The Liep Nio. The magazine is considered to be an important part of the golden age of Peranakan Chinese literature.

Later the magazine switched printers once again to Niro-Thaysiang in Surabaya.

The magazine's run ended in 1942 with the Japanese invasion of the Dutch East Indies.

References

1929 establishments in the Dutch East Indies
1942 disestablishments in the Dutch East Indies
Malay-language magazines
Literary magazines published in the Dutch East Indies
Mass media in Surabaya
Defunct literary magazines